Cardinal Lambertini (Italian: Il cardinale Lambertini) is a 1954 Italian historical comedy film directed by Giorgio Pastina and starring Gino Cervi, Nadia Gray and Arnoldo Foà. It is an adaptation of Alfredo Testoni's 1905 play Cardinal Lambertini, which had previously been turned into a 1934 film adaptation.

The film was released by Minerva Film. Interiors were shot at studios in Rome while location shooting took place in Bologna and the small town of Ceri in Lazio. The film's sets were designed by the art director Peppino Piccolo. It earned around 241 million lira at the box office.

Plot 
1739. Cardinal Prospero Lambertini, very attentive to the political dynamics in Bologna garrisoned by the Bourbon troops and to the sufferings of the Bolognese, did not hesitate to intervene between the Spaniards and an awkward Bolognese nobility, piloted by Countess Gabriella di Roccasibalda, a casual adventurer, and the people, towards which a massacre disguised as an attempted revolt had been planned, which should have been the casus belli of a repression and the establishment of the gonfalonierate for life of a puppet of the Bourbons.

The cardinal also takes to heart the story of two young lovers who are prevented from getting married, Carlo Barozzi, the son of his lackey, and the stepdaughter of Gabriella di Roccasibalda herself, Countess Maria (daughter of her husband's deceased first wife, Count Goffredo) betrothed by her stepmother to the perfidious Duke of Montimar, also with profound political implications.

Cast
 Gino Cervi as Cardinal Lambertini
 Nadia Gray as Isabella di Pietramelara
 Arnoldo Foà as Duke of Montimar
 Carlo Romano as Goffredo di Pietramelara
 Virna Lisi as Maria di Pietramelara
 Sergio Tofano as Canonico Peggi
 Paolo Carlini as Lawyer Carlo Barozzi
 Gianni Agus as Count Pepoli
 Tino Buazzelli as Count Davia
 Agnese Dubbini as Tata, the maid
 Mario Mazza as Anastasio
 Aldo Fiorelli as Abbot Cavalcanti
 Loris Gizzi as Count Orsi
 Piero Pastore as Papal messenger 
 Armando Migliari as Physician
 Mario Siletti as Butler
 Emilio Petacci as Costanzo
 Rita Glori as Marquess Gozzadini

References

Bibliography
 Chiti, Roberto & Poppi, Roberto. Dizionario del cinema italiano: Dal 1945 al 1959. Gremese Editore, 1991.
 Goble, Alan. The Complete Index to Literary Sources in Film. Walter de Gruyter, 1999.

External links

1954 films
Films directed by Giorgio Pastina
1950s Italian-language films
Italian historical comedy films
1950s historical comedy films
Films set in the 1730s
Films set in Bologna
1954 comedy films
Italian films based on plays
Minerva Film films
Italian black-and-white films
1950s Italian films

it:Il cardinale Lambertini (film 1954)